Louise Beaudoin (born September 26, 1945 in Quebec City, Quebec) is a Canadian politician, who represented the electoral district of Rosemont in the National Assembly of Quebec until 2012, as a member of the Parti Québécois (PQ). She sat as an independent from June 6, 2011 to April 3, 2012. She is best known for her previous tenure as a Member of the National Assembly (MNA) of Chambly, from 1994 to 2003, when she occupied various ministerial positions.

Biography
Beaudoin earned a master's degree in history from Université Laval and a master's degree in sociology at the Sorbonne. As a student, like many contemporaries, she was associated with Quebec separatists.

In the 1970s, she worked at the École nationale d'administration publique (ENAP). She was also director of Claude Morin's office.  Posted to the Délégation générale du Québec à Paris from  1984–1985, she was close to René Lévesque in the last years of his life.

Beaudoin was elected as a péquiste in the riding of Chambly in 1994, and re-elected in 1998.

During her time as MNA of Chambly, Beaudoin had several portfolios. At various times she was the minister responsible for the Charter of the French Language, international relations, intergovernmental relations, La Francophonie, Culture and Communications, and globalization. She received some English press coverage for her spirited defence of Bill 101 on an episode of 60 Minutes. Her stringent enforcement of Bill 101 didn't play well with the Anglophone communities in Quebec, and she was famously portrayed as a leather-clad dominatrix by popular Montreal Gazette cartoonist Aislin. On several occasions she has made controversial remarks about culture, claiming, for example, that multiculturalism is a Canadian value but not a Quebec one. With Sheila Copps, the Minister for Canadian Heritage, Beaudoin also worked for the adoption of the UNESCO Universal Declaration on Cultural Diversity, voted on after the September 11 attacks in 2001. The same year, she accused the federal government of lying for not permitting Quebec premier Bernard Landry to participate in the Summit of the Americas.

After eight years as MNA of Chambly, Beaudoin was defeated by the Liberal Diane Legault in 2003. Her defeat was largely attributed to anti-PQ resentment in the Saint-Bruno area of the riding as a result of Bill 170.

After her departure from the National Assembly, she joined the Université du Québec à Montréal as a professor and there continued her studies into globalization.

She was decorated as a commandeur of the Légion d'honneur on September 23, 2004.

She did not run for the PQ in the riding of Chambly in the 2007 elections and her assistant Bertrand St-Arnaud tried to win the seat but lost to adéquiste Richard Merlini.

Beaudoin returned to the political scene in December 8, 2008 by getting elected in Rosemont to succeed the resigned Rita Dionne-Marsolais.

As of 2008, Beaudoin was a host and journalist on Radio-Canada's series 5 sur 5, which answers viewers' questions about a wide variety of topics. She has also served as director of the board for Théâtre Espace Go.

On January 20, 2009, Beaudoin, along with fellow PQ member François Rebello, attended the inauguration of Barack Obama in Washington, D.C.

On June 6, 2011, Beaudoin and caucus mates Lisette Lapointe and Pierre Curzi resigned from the Parti Québécois to sit as independents over the PQ's acceptance of a bill changing the law to permit an agreement between the City of Québec and Quebecor Inc. concerning the construction of an arena in Quebec City.

On April 3, 2012, Beaudoin rejoined the PQ caucus. She did not run for re-election in the 2012 general election.

Electoral record

References

External links

Short biography (in French)
Notice from the Alliance française
English language interview from CBC archives 1997

1945 births
French Quebecers
Independent MNAs in Quebec
Living people
Parti Québécois MNAs
Politicians from Quebec City
Academic staff of the Université du Québec à Montréal
Université Laval alumni
Women MNAs in Quebec
21st-century Canadian politicians
21st-century Canadian women politicians
Women government ministers of Canada
Members of the Executive Council of Quebec